Božac may refer to:

Božac, a mountain in southwestern Serbia, part of Stojkovačka planina
Dalibor Božac, a former Croatian football defender
Franko Božac, a classical accordion performer